Charles-Victor-Hilaire Ratier (13 January 1807 – 6 August 1898) was a 19th-century French playwright, lithographer and printer.

Biography 
The son of a librarian in the Conseil d'État, a teacher of English in the high school of Bourges, he abandoned this business, became a journalist at the Journal du Cher, then a lithographer and printer, patented in Paris February 14, 1829 in succession to Pierre-François Ducarme. In 1829 he founded with the lithographer printer Sylvestre Nicolas Durier the illustrated periodical .

We owe him numerous lithographs and engravings for theatrical publications and magazines such as Album pour rire or Miroir des dames, and many poster prints. He was also the printer and translator of English language novels such as Uncle Tom's Cabin by Harriet Beecher Stowe (1853) or Evangeline by Henry Longfellow (1864).

By his profession, letters were addressed to him by important personalities like Honoré de Balzac who was a friend.

His plays, including some written under the pseudonym Victor Benoît were presented on the most important Parisian stages of his time: Théâtre du Panthéon, Théâtre de l'Ambigu-Comique etc.

Works 
1832: Le Te-Deum et le De Profundis, one-act comédie en vaudeville, with Déaddé Saint-Yves and Michel Théodore Leclercq
1832: Odette, ou la Petite reine, chronique-vaudeville du temps de Charles VI, with Saint-Yves
1835: Arthur et Frédéric, ou Un duel d'écoliers
1838: Rose et Colas, with Saint-Yves and Léon de Villiers, one-act comédie en vaudeville
1840: Les Chiffonniers et les Balayeurs, tragedies in one act and in verse, with Edmé-Jacques-Benoît Rathery
1842: Mme Tastu
1863: Pauvre Père, vaudeville en un acte
1878: Le Dernier des Wiberg

Bibliography 
 Encyclopédie des gens du monde: répertoire universel des sciences..., vol.4, 1834, p. 737
 Joseph-Marie Quérard, La France littéraire ou dictionnaire bibliographique..., 1854, p. 670 
 Gustave Vapereau, Dictionnaire universel des contemporains, vol.2, 1870, p. 1504 (read online)

References

External links 
 Victor Ratier on Data.bnf.fr

19th-century French dramatists and playwrights
19th-century French lithographers
19th-century French male artists
French printers
English–French translators
1807 births
Writers from Paris
1898 deaths
19th-century French translators